Gwen is a 2018 British period folk horror drama film with elements of gothic, supernatural, and psychological horror, written by William McGregor.  The film premiered at the Toronto International Film Festival in 2018, where the film's star Eleanor Worthington Cox received the Toronto International Film Festival Rising Star award. The film is produced by Hilary Bevan Jones.

After the Toronto International Film Festival premiere, Gwen was picked up for distribution in the United States and internationally.

Plot

Gwen, a young farm girl in North Wales, is out playing with her sister Mari. They pass a neighbouring farmhouse where a group of men are tending to some dead bodies. The village doctor says that the entire family died of cholera. Gwen is chastised by her mother for being late and for burning their supper. Her father is not around, for an undisclosed reason. During the night, Gwen wakes and hears a commotion outside, she goes outside but is unable to see anything because of the stormy weather.

The next day, the family goes to church. As they leave, Gwen's mother has a brief conversation with a man, which seems to leave both of them disturbed. On their return home, they find an animal heart nailed to their front door. The heart is thrown into the fireplace and Gwen's mother seems to go into a trance. The following day, Gwen finds their crops have spoiled. That night, Gwen asks about the man her mother spoke to, and asks if she is planning to sell the house, which her mother denies.

The following day, Gwen awakes to see her mother standing in the pasture among their entire flock of sheep, all of which are dead and mutilated. Gwen goes to investigate the house of the neighbours who died. She observes bloody hand prints throughout the house and rotting food on the table as if something sudden and violent had happened. Mother finds her in the house and it is revealed that the neighbours' sheep died in a similar way before the family died. Later, Mother chastises Gwen for entering the house and refuses to listen when Gwen points out the similarities to their own situation.

Back at home, Mother has a violent seizure. Gwen puts her to bed and takes care of Mari. The next day, though still weak and ill, Mother insist on going to church, where she experiences another seizure, prompting attention from the village doctor, Doctor Wren. He prescribes three bottles of a tonic wine, as they have no money, Gwen takes one bottle with the promise to pay him back after the next market. Wren says that the payment is due to the Quarry, which owns his practice. With her mother still ill, Gwen goes to retrieve eggs from the hen but finds that a rat has destroyed the eggs. After supper, Gwen finds her mother cutting her arms and letting the blood flow into a bowl.

The following day, Gwen bags up vegetables to sell at the market. While at the market, the villagers seem to be intentionally ignoring Gwen as she attempts to sell vegetables. She notices she is getting odd, unsettling looks from some people. A young man who smiled at Gwen in church attempts to buy some carrots from her but his father forces him to leave. As she returns home, a flash of lightning frightens her horse, which escapes and runs off.

It later returns to the farm with severely injured legs, and needs to be put down. Men from the Quarry come to the farm to see Mother. Gwen eavesdrops on the conversation, and hears the men claim Gwen stole the tonic (which is Quarry property) and offer to overlook the theft if she sells the land. Mother sends them away and attempts to force Gwen to chop up the horse for meat as punishment. When Gwen refuses, Mother begins angrily hacking off the horse's head with a hatchet, and has another seizure. That night, Gwen has a nightmare about her mother being possessed.

Mother instructs Gwen to retrieve a letter from a box and tells her it arrived shortly after Father left. As Gwen reads the letter she discovers that Father is not returning, for reasons that are unclear, and that Mother has been concealing this from the girls.

A man approaches the farmhouse at night with a dagger. Mother goes outside to investigate and Gwen wakes up and follows. While outside the man approaches them, hits Mother and drags her back to the house, locking Gwen outside. Gwen retrieves a hatchet and breaks the lock. The man attacks Gwen and tries to choke her. Mother seizes the opportunity and slits the man's throat with the dagger he dropped. Knowing more men are coming, she tells Gwen to get Mari. The man from the quarry arrives with a band of men. He hits Gwen's mother and pours liquid on her. He sets her on fire and tells the men to burn down the house.

Gwen and Mari escape into the hills and are watching from a distance. Mari asks Gwen where they will go. Gwen tells Mari they will go find their father.

Cast
 Eleanor Worthington Cox as Gwen 
 Maxine Peake as Elen
 Richard Harrington as Edward Morris 
 Mark Lewis Jones as Mr Wynne 
 Kobna Holdbrook-Smith as Doctor Wren
 Christopher Bonford as extra

Reception
Before release, Screen International picked out Gwen as one of the buzz titles from the UK to be seen at the American Film Market of 2018.

Gwen was also featured in the Great8 program at the Cannes Film Festival 2018, a showcase by the British Council of exciting new UK talent.

Critical response

Critical reception after the film's world premiere at the Toronto International Film Festival was positive. The film became one of the festival's buzz titles, drawing praise for its folk horror roots and unnerving tone.

The site's critics' consensus reads: "Gwens relentlessly grim outlook may wear on some viewers, but it remains a reasonably gripping, solidly assembled descent into atmospheric period horror." Metacritic reports a score of 63 based on 6 critics, indicating "Generally favorable reviews".

Joe Lipsett of Bloody Disgusting gave the film a positive review: "Clever, beautiful and well-acted, Gwen proves to be an unexpected delight. It's a slow burn, but one worth seeking out."

References

External links 

Films set in Wales
2018 films
British horror drama films
2018 horror films
2018 drama films
Films set in 1855
Films set on farms
2010s British films
Folk horror films